Djibo is a town in northern Burkina Faso and the capital city of Soum Province. It was founded in the 16th century and became the capital of Djilgodji, before becoming dominated by the Messina Empire in the 19th century. It is known for its animal market. The main ethnic group is the Fulani.
The spillway of Djibo Dam was the scene of a potentially catastrophic accident involving a cyanide-laden truck en route to the nearby Inata gold mine on the 29th of July 2011.

Africanews reported on 4 March 2022 that a humanitarian crisis was unfolding in the city as it was laid siege to by jihadist forces.

History

References

External links

Populated places in the Sahel Region
Massina Empire
Soum Province